The Ministry of Justice is a ministry in Zambia. It is headed by the Minister of Justice. The Mission of the Ministry is to provide legal services, facilitate dispensation of justice and promote governance mechanisms in order to uphold good governance principles and practices in Zambia.

Departments
The Ministry of Justice in Zambia has six departments:
Department of Human Resource and Administration
Legislative Drafting and Law Revision Department
Department of the International Law and Agreements
Department of Civil Litigation, Debt Collection and Prerogative of Mercy
Department of Administrator-General and Official Receiver
Governance Department

List of ministers

See also

 Justice ministry
 Politics of Zambia

References

External links
Official website

Justice
 
Zambia